George Barfoot (6 November 1812 at Twyford, Hampshire – 1889 at Winchester, Hampshire) was an English first-class cricketer who represented Hampshire, making his debut in 1842 against Marylebone Cricket Club (MCC).

The following season Barfoot played three further first-class matches for Hampshire, twice against Nottinghamshire and once against the Marylebone Cricket Club.

Barfoot followed this up with a single first-class match for Hampshire in 1844 against the Marylebone Cricket Club and played the same opposition for the final time in 1845. In 1845 Barfoot played his final first-class match for Hampshire against Petworth Cricket Club. In his career Barfoot scored 44 runs at a batting average of 3.66 and took a single wicket for the cost of 5 runs.

Barfoot died at Winchester, Hampshire in 1889.

External links
George Barfoot at Cricinfo
George Barfoot at CricketArchive

1812 births
1889 deaths
People from the City of Winchester
English cricketers
Hampshire cricketers